Scouting in Tennessee has a long history, from the 1910s to the present day, serving thousands of youth in programs that suit the environment.

Early history (1910-1950)
The boy scouts were chartered in Tennessee in 1910. Until 1974, some Tennessee councils of the Boy Scouts of America were racially segregated. (The Old Hickory council did not integrate until 1974.) Colored Troops, as they were officially known, were given little support from some Districts and Councils.   Some Scouting executives and leaders believed that Colored Scouts and Leaders would be less able to live up to the ideals of the Boy Scouts.

In 1917 the first girl scout troops in Nashville and elsewhere in Tennessee began meeting.  In 1922 Knox County received a charter.  In 1926 the Nashville Girl Scout Council was chartered. Most Girl Scouts of the USA units were originally segregated by race according to state and local laws and customs. In 1924, Josephine Groves then working at a shelter for African-American mothers and families in need in Nashville heard about Girl Scouting and attended a training course for leaders.  She brought scouting back to the girls at the shelter; however, none of this was official since both she and they were African-American.  She married, becoming Josephine Groves Holloway, and left her job at the shelter but continue to encourage scouting.  In 1933 she requested recognition for her troop from the local council; it was refused until 1942 when permission for the first official African-American Girl Scout troop in Tennessee was given. She also help fully desegregate the Cumberland Valley council in 1962.

Boy Scouts of America in Tennessee today
There are seven Boy Scouts of America (BSA) local councils in Tennessee.

Cherokee Area Council

The Cherokee Area Council serves Scouts in Tennessee and Georgia, with the council office located in Chattanooga, Tennessee. Active from 1914, programs offered include: Cub Scouts, Scouts BSA, Venturing, and Learning for Life.  The council's Skymont Scout Reservation provides year-round and summer camping opportunities on the Cumberland Plateau.

The council is divided into four districts:
 John Ross District
 Sequoyah District
 Ocoee District
 Scout Reach

Council camp
It is also home of the Talidandaganu' Lodge of the Order of the Arrow.

Chickasaw Council

The Chickasaw Council serves Scouts in the Memphis metropolitan area, including all of Shelby County (Tennessee) and Crittenden County (Arkansas), as well as fifteen counties in the Mississippi Delta, including districts that were merged from the Delta Area Council in 1993.

Council camps
Kia Kima Scout Reservation, near Hardy, Arkansas on the South Fork Spring River, was founded in 1916 by Memphis philanthropist Bolton Smith. The reservation, which hosts Chickasaw Council summer camps, is split into three properties: Camp Osage, Camp Cherokee and the Ozark Venture Base. The original Kia Kima facilities (pre-1963) have been restored and maintained as Old Kia Kima by a separate non-profit group.

Camp Currier, Eudora, Mississippi, near Memphis, was founded in 1925 to host weekend camping and training events throughout the year. (The more remote Kia Kima operated only during the summer for most of its history.)

Great Smoky Mountain Council

The Great Smoky Mountain Council serves 21 East Tennessee counties.

Middle Tennessee Council

The Middle Tennessee Council serves 37 Middle Tennessee counties, and is headquartered in Nashville, Tennessee.

Sequoyah Council

The Sequoyah Council serves Scouts in Northeast Tennessee and Virginia.

Organization
 Breaks District
 Buffalo Mountain District
 Nolachuckey District
 Overmountain District
 Wilderness Road District

Council camp
"Camp Davy Crockett", near Rogersville, Tennessee, was founded in 1972.

Lincoln Heritage Council

The Four Rivers District of the Louisville, Kentucky-based Lincoln Heritage Council includes BSA units in South Fulton, Tennessee, located on the state border across from Fulton, Kentucky.

West Tennessee Area Council
Headquartered in Jackson, the West Tennessee Area Council (WTAC) serves Scouts in all Tennessee counties west of the Tennessee River except for Shelby County (Chickasaw Council).
 Big Hatchie District
 Central District
 Davy Crockett District
 Bedford Forrest District
 Shiloh District

Council camp
Camp Mack Morris in Camden, Tennessee serves as the primary camping facility for the WTAC and has been in continuous operation since 1946. It is also the home of Ittawamba Lodge 235 of the Order of the Arrow.

Girl Scouting in Tennessee today

There are four Girl Scout councils serving Tennessee.

Girl Scouts of Greater Atlanta
See Scouting in Georgia for complete information.  This council serves girls in Polk County, Tennessee

Headquarters: Atlanta, Georgia

Girl Scouts Heart of the South
Girl Scouts Heart of the South was established on June 1, 2008, by the merger of Girl Scouts of Northeast Mississippi, Girl Scout Council of Northwest Mississippi, Girl Scout Council of The Mid-South, and Reelfoot Girl Scout Council.  It serves 6,000 girls and has 2,000 adult volunteers in west Tennessee, north Mississippi and Crittenden County, Arkansas.

Headquarters: Memphis, Tennessee

Camps:
 Kamp Kiwani is  including a  lake in Middleton, Tennessee
 Girl Scout Program/Training Center in Memphis, Tennessee

Girl Scouts of Middle Tennessee
Girl Scouts of Middle Tennessee serves over 14,000 girls and has 7,000 adult volunteers in 39 Tennessee counties.  Nashville had its first troop in 1917 and Nashville Girl Scout Council was chartered in 1926.  In 1958 a reorganization led to Cumberland Valley Girl Scout
Council covering 20 counties in Tennessee and southern Kentucky.  In 2006 a new realignment led to the current larger council.

Headquarters: Nashville, Tennessee

Camps:
It is named for Josephine Holloway who founded the first official African-American Girl Scout troop in Nashville in 1942 (some 18 years after establishing one unofficially and 9 years after first seeking official permission).
Its name derives from "friendship crossing" in Cherokee.
It was established in 1959.

Founded in 2017, Girl Scouts of Middle Tennessee Troop 6000 serves scouts at homeless shelters across Middle Tennessee.

Girl Scout Council of the Southern Appalachians (GSCSA)

Formed by the merger of Girl Scouts of the Appalachian Council, Girl Scouts of Tanasi Council, and Girl Scouts of Moccasin Bend Council.

Camps:
 Camp Wildwood in Johnson City, Tennessee is  owned by the Harris Foundation but for the use of the Girl Scouts.
It was acquired in 1965.

Former camps: 
 Camp Sky-Wa-Mo in Bluff City, Tennessee. Put on the market in September 2012.
 Camp Windy Knob in Greenville, Tennessee
 Warren-Kelly Memorial Center for Girls("The Hut") in Big Stone Gap, Virginia

Scouting museums in Tennessee

 The Girl Scout Museum at Daisy's Place, Girl Scout Council of the Southern Appalachians Office in Knoxville
 Peregrine International Museum of Scouting

See also

 Big Cypress Tree State Park

References

Tennessee
Youth organizations based in Tennessee
Southern Region (Boy Scouts of America)